Falls Village is a village and census-designated place in the town of Canaan in Litchfield County, Connecticut, United States. As of the 2010 census it had a population of 538, out of 1,234 in the entire town of Canaan. Because Falls Village is the town center and principal constituent village in Canaan, the entire town is often referred to as "Falls Village". That usage also avoids confusion of the town with Canaan Village in the town of North Canaan, Connecticut, just to the north. Falls Village derives its name from a waterfall, known as Great Falls, on the Housatonic River within the village.

The Falls Village post office is assigned ZIP code 06031, which encompasses the entire town of Canaan.

Geography
Falls Village is on the western side of the town of Canaan in northwestern Connecticut. The western edge of the census-designated place is the Canaan–Salisbury town line following the Housatonic River, it extends north of the village as far as Page Road, and south to a power line corridor that crosses Beebe Hill. To the east the CDP extends out Connecticut Route 126 as far as Johnson Road.

U.S. Route 7 passes through the village, leading north  to Canaan Village and south the same distance to West Cornwall. Route 126 leads east from Falls Village  to Connecticut Route 63 and north  to U.S. Route 44 in North Canaan.

Historic district

In 1979 the Falls Village District was listed on the National Register of Historic Places as an historic district. The district represents about  that were built in the middle of the 19th century as a result of the area being selected as a station stop for the Housatonic Railroad in the early 1830s. Newer buildings around the junction of U.S. Route 7 and Connecticut Route 126 are excluded.

The historic district includes examples of Greek Revival, Italianate, and Queen Anne architecture. It includes 71 buildings and the canal built to harness water power from the Great Falls northwest of the village. The district is bounded on the south by the east-west portion of Railroad Street, on the east by the rear property lines of houses fronting Beebe Hill Road, on the north by the rear property lines of houses fronting Brewster Road, and on the west by the Housatonic Railroad tracks (with a bulge in the northwest to include the unused 1851 canal between Water Street and the railroad tracks).

Contributing properties in the historic district include the D. M. Hunt Library, built in 1891, and St. Patrick's Church.

See also
National Register of Historic Places listings in Litchfield County, Connecticut

References

External links

Town of Canaan / Falls Village official website

Census-designated places in Litchfield County, Connecticut
Canaan (town), Connecticut
Villages in Litchfield County, Connecticut
National Register of Historic Places in Litchfield County, Connecticut
Historic districts on the National Register of Historic Places in Connecticut